Thyrateles is a genus of parasitoid wasps belonging to the family Ichneumonidae.

The species of this genus are found in Europe, Australia and Northern America.

Species:
 Thyrateles amoenapex Heinrich, 1961 
 Thyrateles caliginops Heinrich, 1961

References

Ichneumonidae
Ichneumonidae genera